Desmond de Koker (born 1 June 1991) is a South African cricketer. He made his first-class debut for Free State in the 2010–11 CSA Provincial Three-Day Challenge on 18 November 2010. In September 2019, he was named in Northern Cape's squad for the 2019–20 CSA Provincial T20 Cup.

References

External links
 

1991 births
Living people
South African cricketers
Free State cricketers
Griqualand West cricketers
People from Kimberley, Northern Cape